La Neuville-sur-Essonne (literally La Neuville on Essonne) is a commune in the Loiret department in north-central France.

This commune is the death place of Romanian conductor Sergiu Celibidache

Notable residents
Sergiu Celibidache

See also
Communes of the Loiret department

References

Neuvillesuressonne